Iron Man is a superhero appearing in American comic books published by Marvel Comics. The character was co-created by writer and editor Stan Lee, developed by scripter Larry Lieber, and designed by artists Don Heck and Jack Kirby. The character made his first appearance in Tales of Suspense #39 (cover dated March 1963), and received his own title in Iron Man #1 (May 1968). In 1963, the character founded the Avengers superhero team with Thor, Ant-Man, Wasp and the Hulk.

A wealthy American business magnate, playboy, philanthropist, inventor and ingenious scientist, Anthony Edward "Tony" Stark suffers a severe chest injury during a kidnapping. When his captors attempt to force him to build a weapon of mass destruction, he instead creates a mechanized suit of armor to save his life and escape captivity. Later, Stark develops his suit, adding weapons and other technological devices he designed through his company, Stark Industries. He uses the suit and successive versions to protect the world as Iron Man. Although at first concealing his true identity, Stark eventually publicly reveals himself to be Iron Man.

Initially, Stan Lee used Iron Man to explore Cold War themes, particularly the role of American technology and industry in the fight against communism. Subsequent re-imaginings of Iron Man have shifted to contemporary matters.

Iron Man has headlined various comic book series. Throughout most of the character's publication history, he has been a founding member of the Avengers.  

Iron Man has been adapted for several animated television shows and films. In the Marvel Cinematic Universe, Tony Stark was portrayed by Robert Downey Jr. in the films Iron Man (2008), The Incredible Hulk (2008), Iron Man 2 (2010), The Avengers (2012), Iron Man 3 (2013), Avengers: Age of Ultron (2015), Captain America: Civil War (2016), Spider-Man: Homecoming (2017), Avengers: Infinity War (2018), and Avengers: Endgame (2019); while Mick Wingert voiced the character in the animated series What If...? (2021).

Publication history

Premiere
Iron Man's Marvel Comics premiere in Tales of Suspense #39 (cover dated March 1963) was a collaboration among editor and story-plotter Stan Lee, scripter Larry Lieber, story-artist Don Heck, and cover-artist and character-designer Jack Kirby. In 1963, Lee had been toying with the idea of a businessman superhero. He wanted to create the "quintessential capitalist", a character that would go against the spirit of the times and Marvel's readership. Lee said:

He set out to make the new character a wealthy, glamorous ladies' man, but one with a secret that would plague and torment him as well. Writer Gerry Conway said, "Here you have this character, who on the outside is invulnerable, I mean, just can't be touched, but inside is a wounded figure. Stan made it very much an in-your-face wound, you know, his heart was broken, you know, literally broken. But there's a metaphor going on there. And that's, I think, what made that character interesting." Lee based this playboy's looks and personality on Howard Hughes, explaining, "Howard Hughes was one of the most colorful men of our time. He was an inventor, an adventurer, a multi-billionaire, a ladies' man and finally a nutcase." "Without being crazy, he was Howard Hughes," Lee said.

While Lee intended to write the story himself, a minor deadline emergency eventually forced him to hand over the premiere issue to Lieber, who fleshed out the story. The art was split between Kirby and Heck. "He designed the costume," Heck said of Kirby, "because he was doing the cover. The covers were always done first. But I created the look of the characters, like Tony Stark and his secretary Pepper Potts." In a 1990 interview, when asked if he had "a specific model for Tony Stark and the other characters?", Heck replied "No, I would be thinking more along the lines of some characters I like, which would be the same kind of characters that Alex Toth liked, which was an Errol Flynn type." Iron Man first appeared in 13- to 18-page stories in Tales of Suspense, which featured anthology science fiction and supernatural stories. The character's original costume was a bulky gray armored suit, replaced by a golden version in the second story (issue #40 April 1963). It was redesigned as sleeker, red-and-golden armor in issue #48 (December 1963) by that issue's interior artist, Steve Ditko, although Kirby drew it on the cover. As Heck recalled in 1985, "[T]he second costume, the red and yellow one, was designed by Steve Ditko. I found it easier than drawing that bulky old thing. The earlier design, the robot-looking one, was more Kirbyish."

In his premiere, Iron Man was an anti-communist hero, defeating various Vietnamese agents. Lee later regretted this early focus. Throughout the character's comic book series, technological advancement and national defense were constant themes for Iron Man, but later issues developed Stark into a more complex and vulnerable character as they depicted his battle with alcoholism (as in the "Demon in a Bottle" storyline) and other personal difficulties.

From issue #59 (November 1964) to its final issue #99 (March 1968), the anthological science-fiction backup stories in Tales of Suspense were replaced by a feature starring the superhero Captain America. Lee and Heck introduced several adversaries for the character including the Mandarin in issue #50 (February 1964), the Black Widow in #52 (April 1964) and Hawkeye five issues later.

Lee said that "of all the comic books we published at Marvel, we got more fan mail for Iron Man from women, from females, than any other title ... We didn't get much fan mail from girls, but whenever we did, the letter was usually addressed to Iron Man."

Lee and Kirby included Iron Man in The Avengers #1 (September 1963) as a founding member of the superhero team. The character has since appeared in every subsequent volume of the series.

Writers have updated the war and locale in which Stark is injured. In the original 1963 story, it was the Vietnam War. In the 1990s, it was updated to be the first Gulf War, and in the 2000s updated again to be the war in Afghanistan. Stark's time with the Asian Nobel Prize-winning scientist Ho Yinsen is consistent through nearly all incarnations of the Iron Man origin, depicting Stark and Yinsen building the original armor together. One exception is the direct-to-DVD animated feature film The Invincible Iron Man, in which the armor Stark uses to escape his captors is not the first Iron Man suit.

Themes
The original Iron Man title explored Cold War themes, as did other Stan Lee projects in the early years of Marvel Comics. Where The Fantastic Four and The Incredible Hulk respectively focused on American domestic and government responses to the Communist threat, Iron Man explored industry's role in the struggle. Tony Stark's real-life model, Howard Hughes, was a significant defense contractor who developed new weapons technologies. Hughes was an icon both of American individualism and of the burdens of fame.

Historian Robert Genter, in The Journal of Popular Culture, writes that Tony Stark specifically presents an idealized portrait of the American inventor. Where earlier decades had seen important technological innovations come from famous individuals (e.g., Nikola Tesla, Thomas Edison, Alexander Graham Bell, the Wright brothers), the 1960s saw new technologies (including weapons) being developed mainly by the research teams of corporations. As a result, little room remained for the inventor who wanted credit for, and creative and economic control over, their own creations.

Issues of entrepreneurial autonomy, government supervision of research, and ultimate loyalty figured prominently in early Iron Man stories—the same issues affecting American scientists and engineers of that era. Tony Stark, writes Genter, is an inventor who finds motive in his emasculation as an autonomous creative individual. This blow is symbolized by his chest wound, inflicted at the moment he is forced to invent things for the purposes of others, instead of just himself. To Genter, Stark's transformation into Iron Man represents Stark's effort to reclaim his autonomy, and thus his manhood. The character's pursuit of women in bed or in battle, writes Genter, represents another aspect of this effort. The pattern finds parallels in other works of 1960s popular fiction by authors such as "Ian Fleming (creator of James Bond), Mickey Spillane (Mike Hammer), and Norman Mailer, who made unregulated sexuality a form of authenticity."

Solo series
After issue #99 (March 1968), the Tales of Suspense series was renamed Captain America. An Iron Man story appeared in the one-shot comic Iron Man and Sub-Mariner (April 1968), before the "Golden Avenger" made his solo debut with Iron Man #1 (May 1968). The series's indicia gives its copyright title Iron Man, while the trademarked cover logo of most issues is The Invincible Iron Man.

This initial series ended with issue #332 (September 1996). Jim Lee, Scott Lobdell, and Jeph Loeb authored a second volume of the series which was drawn primarily by Whilce Portacio and Ryan Benjamin. This volume took place in a parallel universe and ran 13 issues (November 1996 – November 1997). Volume 3, whose first 25 issues were written by Kurt Busiek and then by Busiek and Roger Stern, ran 89 issues (February 1998 – December 2004). Later writers included Joe Quesada, Frank Tieri, Mike Grell, and John Jackson Miller. Issue #41 (June 2001) was additionally numbered #386, reflecting the start of dual numbering starting from the premiere issue of volume one in 1968. The final issue was dual-numbered as #434. The next Iron Man series, Iron Man vol. 4, debuted in early 2005 with the Warren Ellis-written storyline "Extremis", with artist Adi Granov. It ran 35 issues (January 2005 – January 2009), with the cover logo simply Iron Man beginning with issue #13, and Iron Man: Director of S.H.I.E.L.D., beginning issue #15. On the final three issues, the cover logo was overwritten by "War Machine, Weapon of S.H.I.E.L.D.", which led to the launch of a War Machine ongoing series.

The Invincible Iron Man by writer Matt Fraction and artist Salvador Larroca, began with a premiere issue cover-dated July 2008. For a seven-month overlap, Marvel published both volume four and volume five simultaneously. This Invincible volume jumped its numbering of issues from #33 to #500, cover dated March 2011, to reflect the start from the premiere issue of volume one in 1968.

After the conclusion of The Invincible Iron Man a new Iron Man series was started as a part of Marvel Now!. Written by Kieron Gillen and illustrated by Greg Land, it began with issue #1 in November 2012.

Many Iron Man annuals, miniseries, and one-shot titles have been published through the years, such as Age of Innocence: The Rebirth of Iron Man (February 1996), Iron Man: The Iron Age #1–2 (August – September 1998), Iron Man: Bad Blood #1–4 (September – December 2000), Iron Man House of M #1–3 (September – November 2005), Fantastic Four / Iron Man: Big in Japan #1–4 (December 2005 – March 2006), Iron Man: The Inevitable #1–6 (February – July 2006), Iron Man / Captain America: Casualties of War (February 2007), Iron Man: Hypervelocity #1–6 (March – August 2007), Iron Man: Enter the Mandarin #1–6 (November 2007 – April 2008), and Iron Man: Legacy of Doom (June – September 2008). Publications have included such spin-offs as the one-shot Iron Man 2020 (June 1994), featuring a different Iron Man in the future, and the animated TV series adaptations Marvel Action Hour, Featuring Iron Man #1–8 (November 1994 – June 1995) and Marvel Adventures Iron Man #1–12 (July 2007 – June 2008).

Fictional character biography

Origins
Anthony Edward Stark is the son of Howard Stark, a wealthy industrialist who leads Stark Industries, and Maria Stark. A boy genius,he entered MIT at 15 to study engineering and later received master's degrees in engineering and physics. After his parents are killed in a car accident, he inherits his father's company.

Stark is injured by a booby trap and captured by enemy forces led by Wong-Chu. Wong-Chu orders Stark to build weapons, but Stark's injuries are dire and shrapnel is moving towards his heart. His fellow prisoner, Ho Yinsen, a Nobel Prize-winning physicist whose work Stark had greatly admired during college, constructs a magnetic chest plate to keep the shrapnel from reaching Stark's heart. In secret, Stark and Yinsen use the workshop to design and construct a suit of powered armor, which Stark uses to escape. During the escape attempt, Yinsen sacrifices his life to save Stark's by distracting the enemy as Stark recharges. Stark takes revenge on his kidnappers and rejoins the American forces, on his way meeting a wounded American Marine fighter pilot, James "Rhodey" Rhodes.

Back home, Stark discovers that the shrapnel fragment lodged in his chest cannot be removed without killing him, and he is forced to wear the armor's chestplate beneath his clothes to act as a regulator for his heart. He must recharge the chestplate every day or else risk the shrapnel killing him. The cover story that Stark tells the news media and general public is that Iron Man is his robotic personal bodyguard, and corporate mascot. To that end, Iron Man fights threats to his company (e.g., Communist opponents Black Widow, the Crimson Dynamo, and the Titanium Man), as well as independent villains like the Mandarin (who becomes his greatest enemy). No one suspects Stark of being Iron Man, as he cultivates a strong public image of being a rich playboy and industrialist. Two notable members of the series's supporting cast, at this point, are his personal chauffeur Harold "Happy" Hogan, and secretary Virginia "Pepper" Potts—to both of whom he eventually reveals his dual identity. Meanwhile, James Rhodes finds his own niche as Stark's personal pilot, ultimately revealing himself to be a man of extraordinary skill and daring in his own right.

The series took an anti-Communist stance in its early years, which was softened as public (and therefore, presumably, reader) opposition rose to the Vietnam War. This change evolved in a series of storylines featuring Stark reconsidering his political opinions, and the morality of manufacturing weapons for the U.S. military. Stark shows himself to be occasionally arrogant, and willing to act unethically in order to 'let the ends justify the means'. This leads to personal conflicts with the people around him, both in his civilian and superhero identities. Stark uses his vast personal fortune not only to outfit his own armor, but also to develop weapons for S.H.I.E.L.D.; other technologies (e.g., Quinjets used by the Avengers); and the image inducers used by the X-Men. Eventually, Stark's heart condition is publicly discovered when he was summoned for a Congressional hearing and Stark collapsed when his chestpiece's power failed, causing a heart attack. Stark was medically examined, which revealed his hidden equipment, and was hospitalized, forcing Pepper to have Happy don his employer's armor to pose as Iron Man to protect his boss's secret identity. Eventually, that specific medical issue was resolved with an artificial heart transplant, which still required the chestplate for some time to support the replacement organ.

1970s and early 1980s
Stark expands on his armor designs and begins to build his arsenal of specialized armors for particular situations such as for space travel and stealth. Stark also develops a serious dependency on alcohol in the "Demon in a Bottle" storyline. The first time it becomes a problem is when Stark discovers that the national security agency S.H.I.E.L.D. has been buying a controlling interest in his company in order to ensure Stark's continued weapons development for them. At the same time, it is revealed that several minor supervillains armed with advanced weapons who had bedeviled Stark throughout his superhero career are in fact in the employ of Stark's business rival, Justin Hammer, who begins to plague Stark more directly. At one point in Hammer's manipulations, the Iron Man armor is taken over and used to murder a diplomat. Although Iron Man is not immediately under suspicion, Stark is forced to hand the armor over to the authorities. Eventually Stark and Rhodes, who is now his personal pilot and confidant, track down and defeat those responsible, although Hammer would return to bedevil Stark again. With the support of his then-girlfriend, Bethany Cabe, his friends and his employees, Stark pulls through these crises and overcomes his dependency on alcohol. Even as he recovers from this harrowing personal trial, Stark's life is further complicated when he has a confrontation with Doctor Doom that is interrupted by an opportunistic enemy sending them back in time to the time of King Arthur. Once there, Iron Man thwarts Doom's attempt to solicit the aid of Morgan Le Fay, and the Latverian ruler swears deadly vengeance—to be indulged sometime after the two return to their own time. This incident was collected and published as Doomquest.

Some time later, a ruthless rival, Obadiah Stane, manipulates Stark emotionally into a serious relapse. As a result, Stark loses control of Stark International to Stane, becomes a homeless alcoholic vagrant and gives up his armored identity to Rhodes, who becomes the new Iron Man. Eventually, Stark recovers and joins a new startup, Circuits Maximus. Stark concentrates on new technological designs, including building a new set of armor as part of his recuperative therapy. Rhodes continues to act as Iron Man but steadily grows more aggressive and paranoid, due to the armor not having been calibrated properly for his use. Eventually Rhodes goes on a rampage, and Stark has to don a replica of his original armor to stop him. Fully recovered, Stark confronts Stane who has himself designed armor based on designs seized along with Stark International, dubbing himself the 'Iron Monger'. Defeated in battle, Stane, rather than give Stark the satisfaction of taking him to trial, commits suicide. Shortly thereafter, Stark regains his personal fortune, but decides against repurchasing Stark International until much later; he instead creates Stark Enterprises, headquartered in Los Angeles.

Late 1980s and 1990s
In an attempt to stop other people from misusing his designs, Stark goes about disabling other armored heroes and villains who are using suits based on the Iron Man technology, the designs of which were stolen by his enemy Spymaster. His quest to destroy the stolen technology—originally called "Stark Wars" but is more commonly known as the "Armor Wars"—severely hurts his reputation as Iron Man. After attacking and disabling a series of minor villains such as Stilt-Man, he attacks and defeats the government operative known as Stingray. The situation worsens when Stark realizes that Stingray's armor does not incorporate any of his designs. He publicly "fires" Iron Man while covertly pursuing his agenda. He uses the cover story of wanting to help disable the rogue Iron Man to infiltrate and disable the armor of the S.H.I.E.L.D. operatives known as the Mandroids, as well as the armor of the Guardsmen. In the process, Iron Man and Jim Rhodes allow some of the villains in the Vault to escape. This leads the United States government to declare Iron Man a danger and an outlaw, and severely sours Stark's relationship with Steve Rogers (Captain America, who was in his "Captain" persona at the time). Iron Man travels to Russia where he inadvertently causes the death of the Soviet Titanium Man during a fight. Returning to the U.S., he faces an enemy commissioned by the government named Firepower. Unable to defeat him head on, Stark fakes Iron Man's demise, intending to retire the suit permanently. When Firepower goes rogue, Stark creates a new suit, claiming a new person is in the armor.

Soon after, Stark is nearly killed by Kathy Dare, a mentally unbalanced former lover. She shoots him dead center in his torso which injures his spine, paralyzing him. Stark undergoes special surgery to have a nerve chip implanted into his spine to regain his mobility. Unbeknownst to the industrialist, the nerve chip is a clandestine means by which to gain control over his body. Rival businessmen the Marrs Twins and their cohort Kearson DeWitt are behind the machinations in what came to be known as "Armor Wars II." After several successful tests by DeWitt at manipulating Stark, Tony finds that using his Encephalo Armor can counteract DeWitt's controls. In response, DeWitt suddenly releases his control resulting in excruciating agony throughout Stark's body. The constant "battle" for control of Stark's nervous system and subsequent abdication on DeWitt's end lead to massive nerve damage throughout Tony's body. Stark's nervous system continues its slide towards failure, and he constructs a "skin" made up of artificial nerve circuitry to assist it. Stark begins to pilot a remote-controlled Iron Man armor, but when faced with the Masters of Silence, the telepresence suit proves inadequate. Stark designs a more heavily armed version of the suit to wear, the "Variable Threat Response Battle Suit", which becomes known as the War Machine armor. Ultimately, the damage to his nervous system becomes too extensive. Faking his death, Stark places himself in suspended animation to heal as Rhodes takes over both the running of Stark Enterprises and the mantle of Iron Man, although he uses the War Machine armor. Stark eventually makes a full recovery by using a chip to create an entirely new (artificial) nervous system, and resumes as Iron Man in a new Telepresence Armor. When Rhodes learns that Stark has manipulated his friends by faking his own death, he becomes enraged and the two friends part ways. Rhodes continues on as War Machine in a solo career.

The Avengers story arc "The Crossing" reveals Iron Man as a traitor among the team's ranks, due to years of manipulation by the time-traveling dictator Kang the Conqueror. Stark, as a sleeper agent in Kang's thrall, kills Marilla, the nanny of Crystal and Quicksilver's daughter Luna, as well as Rita DeMara, the female Yellowjacket, then Amanda Chaney, an ally of the Avengers. The "Avengers Forever" limited series retcons these events as the work of a disguised Immortus, not Kang, and that the mental control had gone back only a few months.

Needing help to defeat both Stark and Kang, the team travels back in time to recruit a teenaged Anthony Stark from an alternate timeline to assist them. The young Stark steals an Iron Man suit in order to aid the Avengers against his older self. The sight of his younger self shocks the older Stark enough for him to regain momentary control of his actions, and he sacrifices his life to stop Kang. The young Stark later builds his own suit to become the new Iron Man and remains in the present day.

During the battle with the creature called Onslaught, the teenage Stark dies, along with many other superheroes. Franklin Richards preserves these "dead" heroes in the "Heroes Reborn" pocket universe, in which Stark is once again an adult hero; Franklin recreates the heroes in the pocket universe in the forms he is most familiar with rather than what they are at the present. The reborn adult Stark, upon returning to the normal Marvel Universe, merges with the original Stark, who had died during "The Crossing", but was resurrected by Franklin Richards. This new Anthony Stark possesses the memories of both the original and teenage Anthony Stark, and thus considers himself to be essentially both of them. With the aid of the law firm Nelson & Murdock, he regains his fortune and, with Stark Enterprises having been sold to the Fujikawa Corporation following Stark's death, sets up a new company, Stark Solutions. He returns from the pocket universe with a restored and healthy heart. After the Avengers reform, Stark demands a hearing be convened to look into his actions just prior to the Onslaught incident. Cleared of wrongdoing, he rejoins the Avengers.

2000s
At one point, Stark's armor becomes sentient despite fail-safes to prevent its increasingly sophisticated computer systems from doing so. Initially, Stark welcomes this "living" armor for its improved tactical abilities. The armor begins to grow more aggressive, killing indiscriminately and eventually desiring to replace Stark altogether. In the final confrontation on a desert island, Stark suffers another heart attack. The armor sacrifices its own existence to save its creator's life, giving up essential components to give Stark a new, artificial heart. This new heart solves Stark's health problems, but it does not have an internal power supply, so Stark becomes once again dependent on periodic recharging. The sentient armor incident so disturbs Stark that he temporarily returns to using an unsophisticated early model version of his armor to avoid a repeat incident. He dabbles with using liquid metal circuitry known as S.K.I.N. that forms into a protective shell around his body, but eventually returns to more conventional hard metal armors.

During this time, Stark engages in a romance with Rumiko Fujikawa, a wealthy heiress and daughter of the man who had taken over his company during the "Heroes Reborn" period. Her relationship with Stark endures many highs and lows, including infidelity with Stark's rival, Tiberius Stone, in part because the fun-loving Rumiko believes that Stark is too serious and dull. Their relationship ends with Rumiko's death at the hands of an Iron Man impostor in Iron Man vol. 3 #87.

In Iron Man vol. 3 #55 (July 2002), Stark publicly reveals his dual identity as Iron Man, not realizing that by doing so, he has invalidated the agreements protecting his armor from government duplication, since those contracts state that the Iron Man armor would be used by an employee of Tony Stark, not by Stark himself. When he discovers that the United States military is again using his technology, and its defective nature nearly causes a disaster in Washington, D.C. which Iron Man barely manages to avert, Stark accepts a Presidential appointment as Secretary of Defense. In this way, he hopes to monitor and direct how his designs are used.

In the "Avengers Disassembled" storyline, Stark is forced to resign after launching into a tirade against the Latverian ambassador at the United Nations, being manipulated by the mentally imbalanced Scarlet Witch, who destroys Avengers Mansion and kills several members. Stark publicly stands down as Iron Man, but continues using the costume. He joins the Avengers in stopping the breakout in progress from the Raft and even saves Captain America from falling. Tony changes the Avengers base to Stark Tower. The Ghost, the Living Laser and Spymaster reappear and shift Iron Man from standard superhero stories to dealing with politics and industrialism.

New Avengers: Illuminati #1 (June 2006) reveals that years before, Stark had participated with a secret group that included the Black Panther, Professor X, Mister Fantastic, Black Bolt, Doctor Strange, and Namor. The goal of the group (dubbed the Illuminati by Marvel) was to strategize overarching menaces, in which the Black Panther rejects a membership offer. Stark's goal is to create a governing body for all superheroes in the world, but the beliefs of its members instead force them all to share vital information.

"Civil War"
In the "Civil War" storyline, after the actions of inexperienced superheroes the New Warriors result in the destruction of several city blocks in Stamford, Connecticut, there is an outcry across America against superhumans. Learning of the Government's proposed plans, Tony Stark suggests a new plan to instigate a Superhuman Registration Act. The Act would force every superpowered individual in the U.S. to register their identity with the government and act as licensed agents. The Act would force inexperienced superhumans to receive training in how to use and control their abilities, something in which Tony strongly believes. Since his struggle with alcoholism, Stark has carried a tremendous burden of guilt after nearly killing an innocent bystander while piloting the armor drunk. While Reed Richards and Dr. Henry "Hank" Pym both agree with Stark's proposal, not everyone does. After Captain America is ordered to bring in anyone who refuses to register, he and other anti-registration superheroes go rogue, coming into conflict with the pro-registration heroes, led by Iron Man. The war ends when Captain America surrenders to prevent further collateral damage and civilian casualties, although he had defeated Stark by defusing his armor. Stark is appointed the new director of S.H.I.E.L.D., and organizes a new government-sanctioned group of Avengers. Shortly afterwards, Captain America is assassinated while in custody. This leaves Stark with a great amount of guilt and misgivings about the cost of his victory.

"Secret Invasion"
To tie into the 2008 Iron Man feature film, Marvel launched a new Iron Man ongoing series, The Invincible Iron Man, with writer Matt Fraction and artist Salvador Larroca. The series inaugural six-part storyline was "The Five Nightmares", which saw Stark targeted by Ezekiel Stane, the son of Stark's former nemesis, Obadiah Stane.

In the "Secret Invasion" storyline, after Tony Stark survives an attempt by Ultron to take over his body, he is confronted in the hospital by Spider-Woman, holding the corpse of a Skrull posing as Elektra. Realizing this is the start of an invasion by the Skrulls, Tony reveals the corpse to the Illuminati and declares that they are at war. After Black Bolt reveals himself as a Skrull and is killed by Namor, a squadron of Skrulls attack, forcing Tony to evacuate the other Illuminati members and destroy the area, killing all the Skrulls. Realizing that they are incapable of trusting each other, the members all separate to form individual plans for the oncoming invasion.

Stark is discredited and publicly vilified after his inability to anticipate or prevent the secret infiltration and invasion of Earth by the Skrulls, and by the Skrull disabling of his StarkTech technology, which had a virtual monopoly on worldwide defense. After the invasion, the U.S. government removes him as head of S.H.I.E.L.D. and disbands the Avengers, handing control of the Initiative over to Norman Osborn.

"Dark Reign" 

With his Extremis powers failing, Stark uploads a virus to destroy all records of the Registration Act, thus preventing Osborn from learning the identities of his fellow heroes and anything that Osborn could use, including his repulsor generators. The only copy of the database is in Stark's brain, which he tries to delete while on the run from Osborn. Stark goes so far as to inflict brain damage on himself in order to ensure that the relevant information is wiped. When Osborn catches up to the debilitated Stark and beats him savagely, Pepper Potts broadcasts the beatings worldwide, costing Osborn credibility and giving Stark public sympathy. Stark goes into a vegetative state, having previously granted Donald Blake (alter ego of the superhero Thor) power of attorney. A holographic message stored in Pepper's armor reveals that Stark had developed a means of 'rebooting' his mind from his current state prior to his destruction of the database, with Blake and Bucky resolving to use it to restore him to normal. Meanwhile, Stark is trapped in his subconscious, where figments of his own mind prevent him from returning to the waking world. When the procedure fails to work, Bucky calls in Doctor Strange, who succeeds in restoring Stark back to consciousness. The backup Stark created was made prior to the Civil War, and as such he does not remember anything that took place during the event, although he still concludes after reviewing his past actions that he would not have done anything differently. His brain damage means he is now dependent on an arc reactor to sustain his body's autonomous functions.

2010s

"Siege"

In the "Siege" storyline, Tony Stark is seen under the care of Dr. Donald Blake and Maria Hill when Asgard is attacked. Thor is ambushed by Osborn and the Sentry, but rescued by Hill. Osborn declares martial law and unleashes Daken and the Sentry on Broxton to root out Thor and Hill. Hill returns to Stark's hiding place to move him to a safer location and are joined by Speed of the Young Avengers, who has a set of Iron Man's MK III armor that Edwin Jarvis had given Captain America.  While Osborn is battling the New Avengers, Stark appears and disables Osborn's Iron Patriot armor. Osborn orders the Sentry to annihilate Asgard, rather than allow the Avengers to have it. After Asgard falls, Stark stands alongside his fellow heroes, as Osborn exclaims they are all doomed and he 'was saving them from him' pointing up towards a Void-possessed Sentry. As the Void tears apart the teams, Loki gives them the power to fight back through the Norn Stones. The Void kills Loki, enraging Thor. Tony tells Thor to get the Void away from Asgard, which allows Tony to drop a commandeered H.A.M.M.E.R. Helicarrier on the Void. Thor is forced to killed Sentry when the Void resurfaces. Sometime later, the Super-Human Registration Act is repealed and Tony is given back his company and armor. As a symbol for their heroics and their new unity, Thor places an Asgardian tower on Stark Tower where the Watchtower once stood.

"Heroic Age"

In the 2010–2011 "Stark: Resilient" storyline, Tony builds the Bleeding Edge armor with the help of Mister Fantastic. This new armor fully uses the repulsor tech battery embedded in his chest to power Tony's entire body and mind, thus allowing him access to Extremis once more. Furthermore, the battery operates as his "heart" and is the only thing keeping him alive. Tony announces he will form a new company, Stark Resilient. He states that he will no longer develop weapons, but will use his repulsor technology to give free energy to the world. Justine and Sasha Hammer create their own armored hero, Detroit Steel, to take Stark's place as the Army's leading weapons-builder. Stark's plan consists of building two repulsor-powered cars. The Hammers try to foil his efforts. The first car is destroyed by sabotage, while Detroit Steel attacks Stark Resilient's facilities while Tony tests the second car. Through a legal maneuver, Tony is able to get the Hammers to stop their attacks and releases a successful commercial about his new car.

"Fear Itself"
In the 2011 "Fear Itself" storyline, Earth is attacked by the Serpent, the God of Fear and the long-forgotten brother of Odin. In Paris, Iron Man fights Grey Gargoyle, who has become Mokk, Breaker of Faith, one of the Serpent's Worthy. Mokk leaves Iron Man unconscious and transforms Detroit Steel and the citizens of Paris into stone. To defeat the Serpent's army, Tony drinks a bottle of wine (thus 'sacrificing' his sobriety) to gain an audience with Odin, who allows Tony to enter the realm of Svartalfheim. Tony and the dwarves of Svartalfheim build enchanted weapons. Tony upgrades his armor with uru-infused enchantments and delivers the finished weapons to the Avengers, who use them for the final battle against the Serpent's forces. Iron Man watches as Thor kills the Serpent, but dies in the process. After the battle is over, Tony melts down the weapons he created and repairs Captain America's shield, which had been broken by Serpent, and gives it back to Captain America. During a subsequent argument with Odin about the gods' lack of involvement in the recent crisis, Odin gives Tony a brief opportunity to see the vastness of the universe the way he sees it.  As thanks for Tony's role in the recent crisis, Odin restores all the people that the Grey Gargoyle killed during his rampage.

Return of the Mandarin and Marvel NOW!
In the storylines "Demon" and "The Long Way Down", Stark is subpoenaed by the U.S. government after evidence surfaces of him using the Iron Man armor while under the influence. Mandarin and Zeke Stane upgrade some of Iron Man's old enemies and send them to commit acts of terrorism across the world, intending to discredit Iron Man. General Bruce Babbage forces Stark to wear a tech governor, a device that allows Babbage to deactivate Stark's armor whenever he wants. To fight back, Tony undergoes a surgical procedure that expels the Bleeding Edge technology out of his body and replaces his repulsor node with a new model, forcing Babbage to remove the tech governor off his chest. He announces his retirement as Iron Man, faking Rhodes's death and giving him a new armor so that he becomes the new Iron Man. This leads into the next storyline, "The Future", in which the Mandarin takes control of Stark's mind and uses him to create new armored bodies for the alien spirits inhabiting his rings, but Stark allies himself with some of his old enemies, who have also been imprisoned by Mandarin, and manages to defeat him. The final issue of this storyline concluded Matt Fraction's series.

In the ongoing series that premiered in 2012 as part of the Marvel NOW! relaunch, Tony Stark has hit a technological ceiling. After the death of Dr. Maya Hansen and the destruction of all of the Extremis Version 2 kits that were being sold to the black market, Tony decides that the Earth is not safe without him learning more from what is in the final frontier. He takes his new suit, enhanced with an artificial intelligence named P.E.P.P.E.R. and joins Peter Quill and The Guardians of the Galaxy after helping them thwart a Badoon attack on Earth.

Superior Iron Man
Tony Stark's personality is inverted during the events of AXIS, bringing out more dark aspects of himself like irresponsibility, egotism and alcoholism. Stark relocates to San Francisco and builds a new, all-white armor. He supplies the citizens of San Francisco with the Extremis 3.0 app, a version of the techno-virus that offers beauty, health or even immortality, free. When every person in the city viewed Iron Man as a messiah for making their dreams come true, he ended the free trial mode and started charging a daily fee of $99.99, causing many to resort to crime to pay for the upgrade. Daredevil confronts Stark at his new Alcatraz Island penthouse, but is easily brushed off. Iron Man uses Extremis 3.0 to temporarily restore Daredevil's sight, just to prove his point. Daredevil deduces that Stark had added Extremis to the water supply and the phones only transmit an activation signal, but Stark subjects Murdock to minor brain damage to prevent him from sharing this revelation with others.

After discovering that new villain Teen Abomination is the son of Happy Hogan, Stark decides to help him, but this minor act of redemption is too late for Pepper Potts, who attacks Stark with the aid of an AI based on Stark's mind. This culminates in a confrontation between the two Starks, as Stark calls on the unwitting aid of all 'infected' with the Extremis upgrade while the AI uses Stark's various old armors to attack him. Although Stark technically wins the battle as he destroys his other armors and deletes the AI backup, Pepper states that she plans to reveal the truth about his goals with Extremis, bluntly informing him that if he continues his Extremis upgrade project, he will have to do it alone, accepting his fate of being regarded as a monster by all who know him.

Time Runs Out
During the "Time Runs Out" storyline, an attempt at reclaiming Wakanda from the Cabal that Namor had created to destroy incursive Earths results in Tony being held captive in the Necropolis. After the Cabal are apparently killed, the Illuminati free Tony, who is forced to flee due to the Illuminati's unwillingness to let Stark be there with them when they meet Rogers and the Avengers. When the Shi'ar and their allies arrive to destroy Earth, the Avengers and the Illuminati unsuccessfully try to retaliate. Iron Man uses Sol's Hammer to destroy the fleet. The incursions continue, and Rogers confronts Stark about what he knows. A fight ensues between them and Stark admits that he had lied and had known about the incursions all along. During the final incursion, Earth-1610's S.H.I.E.L.D. launches a full-scale attack on Earth-616, during which Stark and Rogers are crushed by a Helicarrier.

All-New, All-Different Marvel
After the events of the Secret Wars crossover, Stark returns to his normal self with no signs of his inverted personality. Eight months following the return of the universe as seen in the "All-New, All-Different Marvel" event, Tony works in his laboratory non-stop after his position as an innovator had been put in doubt. Because an M.I.T. student reverse-engineered some of his technology, Stark develops a new armor which can change shape according to the situation he would find himself. When Stark's new AI F.R.I.D.A.Y. informs him that Madame Masque has broken into the ruins of Castle Doom, he travels to Latveria to investigate and runs into some revolutionaries who are then defeated by a man in a suit. To his amazement, Iron Man's armor computer identifies him as Doctor Doom with his face restored. Doctor Doom claims that he wanted to help Iron Man.

After learning from Doctor Doom that Madame Masque has taken a decoy of the Wand of Watoomb, Tony Stark confronts Madame Masque. Upon learning that Madame Masque is not allied with Doctor Doom, Tony is attacked by her with a burst of energy that damages his armor. F.R.I.D.A.Y. manages to gain control of the suit and takes Tony to a safe location. Iron Man tracks Madame Masque to Marina del Rey. After finding a tape recorder with her messages, Tony is attacked by several black silhouettes with swords.

Iron Man escapes the ninjas that are attacking him and manages to defeat most of them, but they kill themselves before he can interrogate any of them. Iron Man and Doctor Doom arrive at Mary Jane Watson's newest Chicago night club Jackpot when Madame Masque attacks it. As Mary Jane distracts Madame Masque by knocking off her mask, Iron Man and Doctor Doom discover that Madame Masque is possessed by a demon. Doctor Doom is able to perform an exorcism on her.

Doctor Strange arrives and tells Iron Man he will take Madame Masque with him to fix her metaphysically and then hand her over at S.H.I.E.L.D. Iron Man also informs him of Doctor Doom's help who had left the scene some time ago. Three days later, Iron Man offers Mary Jane a job to make up for the damage to her nightclub. After speaking with War Machine, Tony Stark meets up at a diner with Amara Perera when they are unexpectedly joined by Doctor Doom who wanted to make sure that the demonic possession that affected Madame Masque has not affected Stark or Amara. Stark shows Mary Jane the demonstration on the people that he will be working with. They are interrupted by F.R.I.D.A.Y. who tells Tony that War Machine is missing. Before heading to Tokyo, Tony receives from Mary Jane the emergency number for Peter Parker. In Tokyo, Iron Man is contacted by Spider-Man at War Machine's last known location as he is being observed by ninjas.

During the Civil War II storyline, Iron Man protests the logic of using precognitive powers to stop future crimes after the recently emerged Inhuman Ulysses predicted Thanos's attack on Project Pegasus. Three weeks later, Iron Man is summoned to the Triskelion after War Machine is killed in battle against Thanos. When Iron Man learns that War Machine and the Ultimates used Ulysses's power to ambush Thanos, he vows to stop anyone from using that power again. Iron Man infiltrates New Attilan and makes off with Ulysses. At Stark Tower, Iron Man vows to find out how Ulysses's precognition works.  The Inhumans attack Stark Tower but are stopped by the Avengers, the Ultimates, and S.H.I.E.L.D. During the confrontation, Ulysses has another vision which he projects to Iron Man and everyone present, showing a rampaging Hulk standing over the corpses of the defeated superheroes. The heroes confront Banner, who is killed by Hawkeye.  Barton claims that Banner was about to transform and Banner had previously asked Hawkeye to kill him if he should turn back into the Hulk. Tony is disgusted at this use of Ulysses's power. When his analysis of Ulysses brain is completed, Tony reveals that Ulysses does not actually see the future, but simply assembles large quantities of data to project likely outcomes. While Danvers continues to use the visions as a resource, Tony objects to the concept of profiling people. This results in a stand-off when Tony's side abducts a woman from custody after Ulysses's visions identified her as a deep-cover HYDRA agent, despite the lack of supporting evidence.

Iron Man learns that his biological mother was actually Amanda Armstrong, who had given him up for adoption and that his biological father was a Hydra double agent named Jude. S.H.I.E.L.D. had Armstrong's baby adopted by Howard and Maria Stark.

Marvel NOW! 2016
In July 2016, it was announced that Tony Stark would hand off the mantle of Iron Man to a 15-year-old girl named Riri Williams. Riri is an MIT student who built her own Iron Man suit out of scrap pieces and, as such, attracted Stark's attention. Early depictions of Williams' suit depict it without the Arc Reactor, but leaves the power source for the suit unclear. Another Iron Man-based series titled Infamous Iron Man debuted featuring Doctor Doom sporting his version of the Iron Man armor. This is revealed to be the result of serious injuries sustained by Stark during his final confrontation with Captain Marvel. Danvers' beating leaves Stark in a coma, but he is left alive due to unspecified experiments Stark has carried out on himself over the years.

Existing as an AI
Following the revelation that Stark experimented on himself at the end of Civil War II, Beast concludes that the only option is to let the experiments do their job in healing Tony and recover on his own. In Invincible Iron Man #1, an employee of Stark sends Riri Williams an artificial intelligence housing a copy of Tony Stark's consciousness to help her control and mentor in her own version of the Iron Man armor. This AI is directly copied from Tony's brain, granting sentience, with Williams commenting on Stark existing as a "techno-ghost". As an AI, Stark can walk around as a hard-light object and gains the ability to remote control his vast armory of Iron Man suits. In The Mighty Captain Marvel #3, the Tony Stark AI goes to Antarctica and visits Captain Marvel with the intent on settling their differences from the Second Civil War, she apologizes to him for her regrets, reconciles with him eventually and they become allies once more. Then in Secret Empire, the Tony Stark AI suits up as Iron Man once again and learns of Captain America's betrayal to Hydra and how he ended up like this. As Hydra tightens its grip across America, the Tony Stark AI leads a team known as the Underground to find the Cosmic Cubes to restore Rogers to his normal self. When things start to escalate, Tony and his crew go rogue and in search for answers for the Cube. As Iron Man and the Underground search for them they are intercepted by Captain America and his Hydra team. With both teams encountering each other, they are captured by the Ultron/Hank Pym hybrid, who forces both teams to sit at a dinner table. During "dinner", Ultron reveals information about the Hydra Avengers – such as Odinson working with Hydra to reclaim Mjolnir, Scarlet Witch being possessed by Chthon, and Vision being affected by an AI virus. Ultron argues that he is doing this because the Avengers have become less of a family over the years as so many of them jump to obey Captain America or Iron Man, despite past experience confirming that this is not always a good idea, but Tony counters that the only reason the team failed as a family was because of Hank's abuse towards Wasp. Enraged, Ultron is about to kill everyone, but Ant-Man is able to calm him down by arguing that Hank remains his own inspiration. Ultron allows the Underground to leave with the fragment, arguing that neither side should have an advantage over the other. Back in America, Hydra Supreme has put Namor in a position where he will be forced to sign a peace treaty that gives Rogers access to the Cosmic Cube fragment in Atlantis, but Hydra Supreme muses that he is unconcerned about who will acquire the fragments, as he has an inside man in the Underground. After the Mount was attacked by Thor and the resurrected Hulk led by Hydra, the Underground evacuated the civilians thanks to Hawkeye and the rest of the heroes. Captain America and Iron Man fight as the Mount collapses around them. The Tony Stark AI initiates the Mount's "Clean Slate Protocol", and blows up the Mount, killing Madame Hydra, then apologizes to Steve Rogers about their past differences, but the A.I survives and, in the aftermath, helps the heroes pull the pieces back together to take down Hydra. When Iron Man confronts Hydra Supreme, he and the other heroes are easily overpowered by him and watch the original Captain America defeat his Hydra self and into celebrating their victory.

Marvel Legacy
Mary Jane Watson and other Stark employees find that Stark's body has completely vanished from its pod, despite tests taken mere hours ago showing no sign of improvement or brain activity. It was discovered that Tony Stark's comatose body was taken to the Stark Industries Complex in Dover. Upon awakening when his biological systems rebooted, Tony Stark went into hiding until he fully recovered. Wanting to make sure that James Rhodes was in a similar state that he was in, Tony Stark exhumed his body from Arlington Cemetery and kick-started the biological systems in him. Afterwards, Iron Man and War Machine fought Hood to keep Stark Industries from falling into Hood's hands where he switched to a version of his Extremis armor. Then he proceeded to defeat Jude when he turned up alive.

During "The Ultron Agenda" arc, Iron Man went up against the Ultron/Hank Pym who begun a plan to merge humans with robots while taking up the name "Ultron Pym." Iron Man was briefly fused with his armor. After using Stark Unlimited's atomic separator on himself, Iron Man figured out that Hank Pym was dead the moment he accidentally fused with Ultron. Not wanting to prove Tony right, Ultron Pym surrendered to Iron Man and the Avengers. As it turned out that Iron Man actually died during the Civil War II storyline, Arno Stark used this to his advantage to acquire Stark Unlimited through a merger with Baintronics. With the combined resources, he built the Iron Man Armor Model 66 as his attempt to recreate the Godbuster Armor. Now having a new destiny, Arno Stark became the latest person to take on the Iron Man mantle.

Because of his revelation that he is now a simulated AI at the start of the "Iron Man 2020" storyline, Tony Stark became Mark One and started to establish the A.I. Army which also consists of Albert, Awesome Android, Egghead II, H.E.R.B.I.E., M-11, Machine Man, Machinesmith, Quasimodo, Super-Adaptoid, Walking Stiletto, the Dreadnoughts, a Sentinel, several Constructo-Bots, several Nick Fury LMDs, and an unnamed bomb disposal robot. This group of robots and androids want to obtain equal rights with organic beings through whatever way possible. Mark One provided them with a hideout on Floor Thirteen, a solid light construct that can only be accessed by robots and androids. With the establishment of Floor Thirteen, Mark One keeps the A.I. Army safe from their enemies and oppressors. Tony Stark was restored to normal thanks to his allies. Then he placed Arno into a virtual reality when he found that Arno's illness was returning as the virtual reality showed Arno leading the charge in defeating the Extinction Entity.

Powers, abilities, and equipment

Armor

Iron Man possesses powered armor that gives him superhuman strength and durability, flight, and an array of weapons. The armor is invented and worn by Stark (with occasional short-term exceptions). It's also constantly improved upon and Stark develops many specialized versions of the armor. Other people who have assumed the Iron Man identity include Stark's long-time partner and best friend James Rhodes; close associates Harold "Happy" Hogan; Eddie March; (briefly) Michael O'Brien and Riri Williams.

The weapons systems of the suit have changed over the years, but Iron Man's standard offensive weapons have always been the repulsor rays that are fired from the palms of his gauntlets. Other weapons built into various incarnations of the armor include: the uni-beam projector in its chest; pulse bolts (that pick up kinetic energy along the way; so the farther they travel, the harder they hit); an electromagnetic pulse generator; and a defensive energy shield that can be extended up to 360 degrees. Other capabilities include: generating ultra-freon (i.e., a freeze-beam); creating and manipulating magnetic fields; emitting sonic blasts; and projecting 3-dimensional holograms (to create decoys).

In addition to the general-purpose model he wears, Stark has developed several specialized suits for space travel, deep-sea diving, stealth, and other special purposes. Stark has modified suits, like the Hulkbuster heavy armor. The Hulkbuster armor is composed of add-ons to his so-called modular armor, designed to enhance its strength and durability enough to engage the Hulk in a fight. A later model, created with the help of Odin and the Asgardian metal Uru, is similar to the Destroyer. Stark develops an electronics pack during the Armor Wars that, when attached to armors that use Stark technologies, will burn out those components, rendering the suit useless. This pack is ineffective on later models. While it is typically associated with James Rhodes, the War Machine armor began as one of Stark's specialty armors.

The most recent models of Stark's armor, beginning with the Extremis armor, are now stored in the hollow portions of Stark's bones, and the personal area networking implement used to control it is implanted into his forearm, and connected directly to his central nervous system.

The Extremis has since been removed, and he now uses more conventional armors. Some armors still take a liquid form, but are not stored within his body. His Endo-Sym Armor incorporates a combination of the liquid smart-metal with the alien Venom symbiote, psionically controlled by Stark.

Post-Secret Wars, Stark uses a more streamlined suit of armor that uses nanotechnology to shape shift into other armors or weapons.

Powers
After being critically injured during a battle with the Extremis-enhanced Mallen, Stark injects his nervous system with modified techno-organic virus-like body restructuring machines (the Extremis process). By rewriting his own biology, Stark is able to save his life, gain an enhanced healing factor, and partially merge with the Iron Man armor, superseding the need for bulky, AI-controlled armors in favor of lighter designs, technopathically controlled by his own brain. His enhanced technopathy extends to every piece of technology, limitless and effortlessly due to his ability to interface with communication satellites and wireless connections to increase his "range". Some components of the armor-sheath are now stored in Tony's body, able to be recalled, and extruded from his own skin, at will.

During the "Secret Invasion" storyline the Extremis package is catastrophically shut down by a virus, forcing him again to rely on the previous iteration of his armor, and restoring his previous limitations. Furthermore, Osborn's takeover of most of the few remaining Starktech factories, with Ezekiel Stane systematically crippling the others, limits Tony to the use of lesser, older and weaker armors.

After being forced to "wipe out" his brain to prevent Norman Osborn from gaining his information, Tony Stark is forced to have a new arc reactor, of Rand design installed in his chest. The process greatly improves his strength, stamina and intellect. The procedure left him with virtually no autonomic functions: as his brain was stripped of every biological function, Tony is forced to rely on a digital backup of his memories (leaving him with severe gaps and lapses in his long-term memory) and on software routine in the arc reactor for basic stimuli reaction, such as blinking and breathing. The Bleeding Edge package of armor and physical enhancement is now equal in power, if not a more advanced, version of the old Extremis tech.

Skills
Considered to be one of the most powerful non powered humans on the planet, Tony Stark is a highly intelligent inventor and scientist as well as being a successfully wealthy businessman in charge of his own company. 

An inventive genius whose expertise in the fields of mathematics, physics, chemistry, and computer science rivals that of Reed Richards, Hank Pym, and Bruce Banner, and his expertise in electrical engineering and mechanical engineering surpasses even theirs. He is regarded as one of the most intelligent characters in the Marvel Universe. He graduated with advanced degrees in physics and engineering at the age of 17 from Massachusetts Institute of Technology (MIT) and further developed his knowledge ranging from artificial intelligence to quantum mechanics as time progressed. His expertise extends to his ingenuity in dealing with difficult situations, such as difficult foes and deathtraps, in which he is capable of using available tools, including his suit, in unorthodox but effective ways. For instance, in Stark's final confrontation with Obadiah Stane, the villain managed to have Stark's companions in an unconscious state in a room with motion sensors; when Stark entered the room, Stane warned him that the slightest move would trigger a fatal electrical current to his hostages, thus forcing Stark to stay still and slowly die of dehydration lest he wants his friends to die. However, while Stane was confident that such a trap was inescapable, Stark is able to outwit and defeat its mechanism in seconds, thus freeing the hostages and allowing him to continue the battle against Stane.

As the CEO of Stark Industries, Stark is well respected in the business world, able to command people's attention when he speaks on economic matters, having over the years built up several multimillion-dollar companies from virtually nothing. He is noted for the loyalty he commands from and returns to those who work for him, as well as for his business ethics. Thus he immediately fired an employee who made profitable, but illegal, sales to Doctor Doom. He strives to be environmentally responsible in his businesses.

Considered to be one of the wealthiest men on the planet, the success of Stark Industries provides Tony with a seemingly bottomless  revenue stream that allows him to not only enjoy a life of luxury further build up his company but also allows him to fund his superhero activities. Even before becoming Superhero, Tony often purchased the most expensive clothes, cars, houses and other luxury items money can buy. After becoming a hero, Tony began using his vast wealth to continue superhero activities by building his Iron Man suit and later creating an arsenal of other suits that serve multiple purposes. Stark also provides funding to several peacekeeping organizations and superhero teams among them being S.H.I.E.L.D. and the Avengers.

At a time when Stark was unable to use his armor for a period, he received some combat training from Captain America and has become physically formidable on his own when the situation demands it. In addition, Stark possesses great business and political acumen. On multiple occasions he reacquired control of his companies after losing them amid corporate takeovers.

Due to his membership in the Illuminati, Iron Man was given the Space Gem to safeguard. It allows the user to exist in any location (or all locations), move any object anywhere throughout the universe and warp or rearrange space.

Supporting characters

Cultural impact and legacy

Accolades 
 In 2011, IGN ranked Iron Man 12th in their "Top 100 Comic Book Heroes" list.
 In 2012, IGN ranked Iron Man 3rd in their list of "Top 50 Avengers" list.
 In 2015, Entertainment Weekly ranked Iron Man 10th in their "Let's rank every Avenger ever" list.
 In 2015, Gizmodo ranked Iron Man 5th in their "Every Member Of The Avengers, Ranked" list.
 In 2015, BuzzFeed ranked Iron Man 2nd in their "84 Avengers Members Ranked From Worst To Best" list.
 In 2016, Screen Rant ranked Iron Man 12th in their "20 Most Powerful Members Of The Avengers" list.
 In 2017, CBR.com ranked Iron Man 17th in their "15 Avengers Leaders, Ranked From Worst To Best" list.
 In 2018, GameSpot ranked Iron Man 9th in their "50 Most Important Superheroes" list.
 In 2019, Comicbook.com ranked Iron Man 9th in their "50 Most Important Superheroes Ever" list.
 In 2019, Empire ranked Iron Man 17th in their "50 greatest comic-book characters" list.
 In 2022, Collider ranked Iron Man 5th in their "10 Smartest Marvel Universe Geniuses" list.
 In 2022, The A.V. Club ranked Iron Man 4th in their "100 best Marvel characters" list.
 In 2022, The Mary Sue ranked Iron Man 10th in their "The Best and the Brightest of All the Superheroes" list.
 In 2022, Nerdist ranked Iron Man 9th in their "Top 10 Marvel Comics Rogues Galleries" list.
 In 2022, Newsarama ranked Iron Man 3rd in their "Best Avengers members of all time" list.
 In 2022, Entertainment Weekly ranked Iron Man 6th in their "50 most powerful superheroes" list.

Impact 

 The rapper Ghostface Killah, a member of Wu-Tang Clan, titled his 1996 debut solo album Ironman, and has since continued to use lyrics related to the Iron Man comics and samples from the animated TV shows on his records. He has adopted the nickname Tony Starks as one of his numerous alter-egos, and was featured in a scene deleted from the Iron Man film.
 Paul McCartney's song "Magneto and Titanium Man" was inspired by the X-Men's nemesis and the original version of the Iron Man villain. Another Iron Man villain, the Crimson Dynamo, is mentioned in the lyrics to this song.
 The British band Razorlight mentions Tony Stark in a verse of their song, "Hang By, Hang By".
 The character of Nathan Stark on the television show Eureka is inspired by Tony Stark.
 Two Iron Man-themed trucks compete in the Monster Jam monster truck racing series. Debuted in Atlanta on 9 January 2010, they are driven by Lee O' Donnell and Morgan Kane.
 In 2015, University of Central Florida engineering student Albert Manero, who builds and donates affordable 3D-printed bionic limbs to those in need, constructed a bionic arm based on Iron Man's suit for 7-year-old Alex Pring, a superhero fan who was born with a partially formed right arm. He then delivered the Iron Man arm to Pring with the help of Robert Downey Jr. in character as Tony Stark.
 For Major League Baseball Players Weekend in August 2018, New York Yankees second baseman Gleyber Torres designed his custom cleats after Iron Man's suit.
 A TV show demonstrated a hovering bullet-mitigating suit with some of the official Marvel design features in 2019.
 Ice hockey players Anže Kopitar of the Los Angeles Kings and Yanni Gourde of the Seattle Kraken participated in a ceremonial puck drop featuring Iron Man and a boy from the Children's Hospital Los Angeles, as part of 'Marvel Super Hero Night'.
 In 2019, a statue representing the character in his Iron Man armor was erected in Forte dei Marmi, Italy.

Other versions

1602
1602: New World features a 17th-century Spanish Iron Man named Lord Iron. Taken captive in the Holy Land during the English / Spanish war, he is forced to make weapons for them after being tortured by David Banner, the later Hulk of that world. He needs his massive armor to survive. The armor is powered by "lightning bottles" and provides him with super-strength and invulnerability as well as several electricity-powered 

With his Moorish associate, Rhodes, Lord Iron is assigned by King James to put an end to the traitors and witchbreed in the New World. Instead, he realizes he has let bitterness consume him, and makes his peace with Banner. He is last seen using his armor to power the colony's printing press.

2020
Iron Man 2020 features Arno Stark as a mercenary in the employ of Sunset Bain. In 2012, Arno had traveled to the past in an effort to save his family from a madman's bomb. All he needs are the retinal patterns of the bomb maker, but he runs into the original Blizzard who mistakes him for the "real" Iron Man/Tony Stark. Not having time to deal with this threat, Arno kills Blizzard. While attempting to scan the retinal patterns of the young terrorist, Spider-Man snatches the scanner with his webbing and asks IM 2020 what he is doing. The two battle one another (Arno is "against the clock") when suddenly Arno is pulled back to his time to discover the bomb had a design flaw and exploded prematurely. His wife, son, employees, and factory have all been destroyed.

2093
Tony Stark and Doctor Doom are brought to the year 2093 by Merlin to stop a plot by a primarily robotic Doom and the Iron Man of 2093, Andros Stark. Andros is a psychotic madman and uses his grandfather Arno's armor. Tony defeats Andros while wielding the legendary sword Excalibur.

Andros Stark/Iron Man 2099 voiced by Alessandro Juliani would later be adopted into the second season of Iron Man: Armored Adventures with him being from the year 2099 and traveling back when Tony was a teenager before inventing an AI named "Vortex". Vortex dooms the entire human race with Andros donning a futuristic suit (classed "Hyperspace Mark XL") and the Extremis to kill Tony/Iron Man but goes to S.H.I.E.L.D. for assistance. Andros destroys Iron Man with his ultra-beam, afterward, Hawkeye managed to implant the virus on Andros's armor, and realized that all this is because Tony was trying to save himself by using the virus to stop Andros using his nano-virus which is actually the original seed for the Vortex virus. He travels back in time for a short moment to warn Iron Man that his nano-virus chips were actually the Vortex virus. He quickly destroys the last nano-virus arrow, saving Andros. As a result of this change in the timeline, the future was saved and because of this, Andros is erased from existence after saying his last words to his grandfather.

3030
The Iron Man of 3030 is Tony Stark's biracial granddaughter, Rhodey Stark (named after Stark's close friend James Rhodes). She travels to the present in order to help the Avengers save Earth from a rogue planet that had been fired from the future, and departs after warning her grandfather that his life is in danger.

Adam Warlock
In Adam Warlock #2 (1972), Peter Parker's counterpart on Counter-Earth mentions that "the heart of Tony Stark beats unscathed".

Age of Apocalypse
In the Age of Apocalypse, Tony Stark is an agent of the Human High Council. The injury that compromised his heart is caused by the attack of a mutant.

Age of X

Officially code named Iron Man, he prefers the name Steel Corpse. Iron Man was infected by a disease, thought to be of mutant origin, that bonded him permanently to his armor. Not only can he never remove the armor, the disease is causing the armor to slowly consume his flesh, meaning that one day Tony Stark will cease to exist and only the armor will be left. He works with this reality's version of the Avengers to exterminate all mutants, but eventually rebels against his purpose when a 'Trojan horse' in the armor nearly drives him to kill innocent mutant children, forcing his teammates to kill him.

Avataars
In the sword and sorcery world of the Avataars: Covenant of the Shield miniseries, Iron Man's counterpart is Ironheart, one of the Champions of the Realm. A powerful warrior, he wears a huge suit of grey armor.

Bullet Points
In Bullet Points, Iron Man is Steve Rogers, who, due to the assassination of Dr. Abraham Erskine occurring earlier than in the mainstream Marvel universe, never receives the Super-Soldier formula. Instead, he agrees to be bonded to the prototype 'Iron Man' armor despite the intense physical pain and discomfort this will cause. Rogers is later killed fighting an alternative version of the Hulk. Tony Stark, in this reality a member of S.H.I.E.L.D., expresses a desire to continue in Rogers' footsteps as Iron Man, but is rejected owing to a heart condition. He later disobeys this command and adopts the mantle upon the arrival of Galactus.

Contest of Champions
The 2015 Contest of Champions series has a version of Tony Stark that won Civil War with nearly everything working out in his favor. Five years later, Tony has donned the Iron Patriot armor and is the President of the United States. He and his Mighty Avengers team are kidnapped by Maestro and placed onto Battleworld, where Maestro alters their memories to believe the remaining heroes are unregistered and need to be taken in. Their fight is interrupted by that universe's Thunderbolts (led by Steve Rogers). In the next issue, the Mighty Avengers battle the Thunderbolts and Renegade Champions, during which Tony kills Steve and reveals that the reason the Civil War went completely in his favor was because he used the Reality Gem from the Infinity Gauntlet. When he tries to use it again on Battleworld, it does not work because he is in a different dimension, and he is killed by Maestro.

Earth X
In the alternative reality of Earth X, Tony Stark builds a headquarters that protects himself from a plague that grants all humans superpowers. Afterwards, he builds the Iron Avengers. His headquarters is revealed to be a giant armor, based on the old Godzilla fighting mecha, the Red Ronin, which he uses to delay the Celestial attack until the coming of Galactus, sacrificing his life in the process. In Paradise X, he becomes part of the angelic Avenging Host of Marvel's "Paradise", with an Iron Man motif.

Earth-691
In the continuity of Earth-691, Tony Stark is devastated by the horrors of the Martian invasion and jettisons his technology into space. It is found by a primitive alien race who use it to become an interstellar menace calling themselves the Stark, who subsequently clash with the Guardians of the Galaxy in the 31st century. "Standard" continuity Iron Man (Earth-616) encountered his "creations" when a cadre of rational, scientific members of the Stark called the Programmers bring Tony Stark to the future to help them solve various planet-wide problems.

Earth-818
On Earth-818 which was conquered by Multiversal Masters of Evil member Black Skull, Tony Stark was forced by Black Skull to build the War Machines to build his army. He would later escape from Black Skull's clutches and become Ant-Man where he formed a resistance that involved Vision, Moon Knight (Mariama Spector), Wonder Man, and Infinity Thing. Ant-Man later led the resistance in rescuing Robbie Reyes from Black Skull while being assisted by a robotic ant named Shellhead. With help from the granddaughters of King Thor, Robbie, his Deathlok companion, and the resistance defeated Black Skull and his counterparts as Vision and Moon Knight get sucked into a portal. Afterwards, Ant-Man showed the granddaughters of King Thor the Mjolnir he found. After the granddaughters of King Thor bring rain to Earth-818, Ant-Man joins Robbie and his Deathlok companion on their quest while Wonder Man and Infinity Thing work to rebuild Earth-818.

Arriving in an unnamed reality, Ant-Man of Earth-818, Ghost Rider, and his Deathlok companion follow the signal of that reality's T'Challa to an active star. After Ghost Rider drives his car through the active star to retrieve a vibranium cocoon, T'Challa emerges from it and takes the name Star Panther. Looking for other allies, Ant-Man, Ghost Rider, and his Deathlok companion enlist Captain Ape-Merica from Earth-8101, the Captain America from Earth-71912, Cap-Wolf from Earth-666, Yeoman America from Earth-398, and a U.S. Agent variant of Steve Rogers to train the powerless Steve Rogers variants and a Weapon America version of Steve Rogers in a prison-like training ground. They next plan to recruit a Steve Rogers from Earth-4479 who was a drifter that got caught in a gamma bomb explosion. Ant-Man accompanies Ghost Rider on a trip to Earth-56377 where they pick up its Thor who wields the Iron Fist move and the Mjolnir that has followed him ever since Thor had been unworthy to lift it.

Traveling with Ghost Rider and his Deathlok companion, Ant-Man recalls with them on how they found Star Panther, the Thor who became the "God of Fists", the all Steve Rogers army that was dubbed the Howling Commandos, and the Carol Corps. Ant-Man is surprised that the last pillar that they have to complete is Iron Man and that they need an Iron Man in their group. They go to unnamed alternate realities where they find an alcoholic Iron Man who crashed trying to avoid them, a Tony Stark that mostly did his work in a junkyard who is already dead because people thought he was a witch, a Tony Stark in Godkiller armor who is not interested in protecting the Earth as it consumes a planet, 30 Tony Starks who use their armors as robot bartenders, two dozen Tony Starks who flew into the sun either on purpose or by accident, 50 Tony Starks who are in catatonic states, and others who went mad. After a visit to a Tony Stark who is a perfectionist trying to build the perfect armor even though his captors have been dead for 10 years, the next visit was to an elderly Tony Stark who ran a repair shop until he was too old and died in Ant-Man's company. Ant-Man then threw some alcohol into the Hell Charger's trunk and returned to the perfectionist Tony Stark's reality and introduces him to the Godkiller Tony Stark and the other Tony Stark variants they successfully recruited as they all say hi to the perfectionist Tony Stark.

Following a mission where Ant-Man, Ghost Rider, and Deathlok have helped Captain Fury against the Goblin Corps, the three of them are informed that their time is up and to head to Avenger Tower at Infinity's End. Ant-Man of Earth-818 is looking forward to meeting Avenger Prime. After Ghost Rider gets word that another Spirit of Vengeance has fallen, he subdues Ant-Man and Deathlok in chains and takes off. By the time they catch up with Ghost Rider on an unidentified world, he was already engaging Doom Supreme as Ant-Man shrinks him. When Dark Phoenix goes on the attack, Deathlok tells Ant-Man to get Ghost Rider away as he buys them some time.

Ant-Man and Robbie Reyes arrive at Avengers Tower in the Quarry of Creation where they find it under attack by the members of the Council of Red. As the Hell Charger drives into some of them, Ant-Man learns from Robbie that he can't transform into Ghost Rider.

When the Council of Red continues the attack on Avengers Tower, Ant-Man notes that he hasn't seen the inside of this Avengers Tower before as he is reunited with Moon Knight and Vision. After telling them about Robbie's fight with Doom Supreme and the Multiversal Masters of Evil, Ant-Man makes use of the ants in Avengers Tower's ant farm and shrinks himself, Vision, and Moon Knight down to small size. While underground, they find that some of the Council of Red members are digging a tunnel of their own toward the First Firmament. As they fight the Council of Red members present, one member tries to get Ant-Man intoxicated only to be defeated by Moon Knight. Just then, Ant-Man, Vision, and Moon Knight are saved upon the arrival of Old Man Phoenix and the granddaughters of King Thor. Ant-Man informs all friendly allies to stay clear of the attacks done by Old Man Phoenix and the granddaughters of King Thor. When the surviving members of the Council of Red are repelled, Doom Supreme shows up with Doom the Living Planet and the Doctor Doom variants loyal to him. Ant-Man and the Multiversal Avengers fight them as he is among those who witness the arrival of Avengers Prime whose identity is revealed to be a variation of Loki. Avenger Prime's origin was revealed as Ant-Man was still surprised at the identity while the granddaughters of King Thor asks how they can trust him. When more Doctor Doom variants show up, Ant-Man is among those who witness Avenger Prime summon more Avengers to help them. As the Multiversal Avengers fight the Doctor Doom variants with help from the Earth-616 Avengers, Ant-Man fights alongside Iron Man of Earth-616. Ant-Man is contacted by Thor of Earth-56377 informing him of one more Mephisto as he claims that they are going to need more Avengers. He then sees a Celestial-sized Mephisto as it takes down the Carol Corps' Omni-Carrier. Ant-Man proceeds to inform Avenger Prime of what happened.

Earth-2122
In the continuity of Earth-2122, the home of Crusader X, where the British won the American Revolution and still control North America, Anthony Stark is a member of a group called the Sons of Liberty. In this reality, Stark is willing to kill innocent people.

Earth-3490
In the continuity of Earth-3490, Tony Stark was born a woman (Natasha Stark) rather than a man; Stark's superhero alter-ego in this universe is Iron Woman. The Civil War between superheroes in Earth-3490 was averted due to the fact that Stark and Steve Rogers (Captain America) are romantically involved, and have since married.

Exiles
Different versions of Iron Man appear in the pages of Exiles:

 In one reality, a villainous alternative Iron Man of Earth-2020 is a member of Weapon X, the more ruthless team of reality fixers. After ending up at the 'Crystal Palace' (the Exiles' headquarters) and fighting them there, he is eventually exposed and sent back to his own timeline where he is arrested by the Army for starting a world war.
 In one alternative reality Tony Stark has become the absolute ruler of the entire planet Earth, and kills many of that Earth's heroes and mutants. Weapon X arrives on this reality to help him conquer Attilan, though their true purpose is to cause his downfall. Tony is eventually killed by Susan Storm.
 In one alternative reality, he is partners with both Mister Fantastic and Doctor Octopus before he created the Iron Man suit.
 On an alternative world devastated by the Hulk's Annihilation Wave, Iron Man was one of those killed in the attack. When the Exiles arrange for the dead heroes to be replaced by alternatives, Iron Man's replacement is a version of Spitfire, on the grounds that they have never got along with any alternative Tony Starks.
 The Sons of Iron are a group of armor-wearing warriors from an Earth shared by humans and reptilian humanoids. Because they are completely concealed by the Iron Man armor, no-one can tell which they are.

Fantastic Four: The End
In the miniseries Fantastic Four: The End, which is set in a future where Reed Richards' technology has launched humanity into a golden age, Tony Stark has died long ago - but his consciousness survives, 'hopping' from artificial body to artificial body. Most of the bodies shown in the miniseries resemble Iron Man armors, often being identical to existing armors. One notable exception was the bulky, stocky space-armor which played an important role in the battle of humanity's heroes versus several alien armadas.

House of M
Born to Howard and Maria Stark, the heads of the powerful business conglomerate Stark Industries, Tony Stark grew to be an imaginative and brilliant inventor. He worked with his father from an early age, and surpassed his father's technical brilliance by the age of 16.  Stark became the key supplier of hi-tech weaponry used to fight mutants, and was on the verge of a technological breakthrough when the Mutant-Human war came to an end.  The suits are powered down to become part of a game called Robo Death Match, a television sport with giant robots fighting each other.  Stark Industries scored its biggest victory when it secured the Sentinel production contracts, pushing major competitor, Jason Wyngarde, out of business. Erik Magnus and Sebastian Shaw awarded Tony the contract under the condition that he would hire Beast and Forge as observers. McCoy became a key contributor along with Doctor Pym on The Vision project. Tony secretly worked on a special project beneath Stark Industries: a brand new suit of hi-tech armor he planned to use as his new Robo Death Match suit.

Infinity Warps
During the Infinity Wars storyline, where the universe was combined in half, Iron Man was fused with Thor creating Iron Hammer. Sigurd Stark was the fifth richest person on the world thanks to his genius about technology, however due to his lack of memories before five years, taunted him driving to drink. After going through the Norvegian, he was attacked by some Dark Elves, led by Krimson Kurse (fusion Crimson Dynamo and Kurse). He got poisoned by an arrow, slowing killing him and taken by the Elves to aid their other prisoner Eitri (fusion of Eitri and Ho Yinsen) in order to build powerful weapons for the Elves. Then, Sigurd became friend with Eitri and together build an armor, that prevented the poison from killing Sigurd, along with a hammer in order to escape the Dark Elves. However, during their escape Eitri is killed and after Sigurd defeated the Elves and Krimson Kurse, he discovered that Krimson was his lost friend who had turned into a Thrall to be a servant to Dark Elves and after that he mercy killed his friend. Sigurd then decided to the All-Father on Asgard to seek help into defeating Malekith (fusion of Malekith and Mandarin) and with the help of his AI assistant H.E.I.M.D.A.L.L. (fusion of Heimdall and J.A.R.V.I.S.) opened the B.I.F.R.O.S.T. and went to Asgard. When travelling, he remembered his old memories: his true name was Stark Odinson, who due to his arrogance, his father Howard Odin (fusion of Howard Stark and Odin) banished his son to Earth where he would learn to how is like to be a mortal. Upon arriving, Malekith had trapped the Aesir and had allied with Madame Hel (fusion of Madame Masque and Hela) and Stane Odinson (fusion of Loki and Obadiah Stane). Luckily, Iron Hammer was able to defeat Malekith and Odin allowed his son to become a god again. However, Sigurd refused, feeling better as a human.

Inter-company crossovers
In Marvel and DC's Amalgam Comics, Stark is merged with the Green Lantern Hal Jordan into the Iron Lantern. "Hal Stark" wears a suit resembling a green Iron Man armor, powered by a Green Lantern battery.

In the miniseries JLA/Avengers, Iron Man aids the Avengers in the battle against Starro the Conqueror. Afterwards, he creates a dimensional alarm in order to tell when invaders from another dimension come into their universe. After a brief scuffle with the JLA in the Savage Land, the Avengers are confronted by Metron, who gives Tony a Mother Box. Using this, Tony is able to get the Avengers to Metropolis, where the Avengers confront the JLA again. The Avengers escape, but Tony and Hawkeye manage to take Green Lantern's Power Battery before they leave, with Tony able to stop the Flash in his tracks. The two later take down Captain Atom and Green Arrow in order to collect the Casket of Ancient Winters. Tony then leaves and arrives to save Photon and Quasar from Wonder Woman and Green Lantern, allowing them to take the Spear of Destiny. After the battle in the Savage Land, Tony is one of the Avengers and is clueless as to the dimensional shifts that are happening around him. After Cap and Superman attack each other, Tony ends up in Metropolis. When the two worlds are briefly corrected by the Grandmaster, Tony is shown his true future with his alcoholism and his defeat by Obadiah Stane. Accepting this, he aids the JLA and the Avengers in the final battle and helped build the ship that took them to Krona's base. During the battle, he teams up with Kyle Rayner to create a weapon to use against their enemies and the two are shown to be impressed by one another, Kyle expressing his awe at Tony's engineering prowess and Tony asking Kyle where he could get a Green Lantern ring.

Iron Man: The End
In the one-shot Iron Man: The End, an aging Tony Stark works on his greatest creation, a space elevator called "Big Jump." Stark faces retirement due to age and the physical toll of an illness, no longer allowing him to run his business "Stark Universal" and continue to be Iron Man. This leads to the need to groom a replacement.

Iron Maniac
Iron Maniac is an evil alternative universe version of Iron Man from Earth-5012. He first appeared in Marvel Team-Up vol. 3 #2, wearing armor that resembles that of Doctor Doom's. He comes from an alternative reality where most of the Avengers were killed when they encountered the vicious alien Titannus in space. While the team is rescued by the reserve Avengers five years later, it takes another five years to fight back the Trellions, the alien race that has brainwashed Titannus. During that time, a power-hungry Reed Richards turns his back on the surviving heroes. Scarred for life due to an attack from the Human Torch, Iron Man sets his own operation base in Latveria to "take over the world to save it from Richards." Richards somehow manages to banish him into Earth-616 Other differences between his world and Earth-616 include that there is no Spider-Man, and that Hank Pym is another version of the Hulk.
 
After being transported to Earth-616, Iron Maniac fights the Fantastic Four and Doctor Strange, all of whom mistake him for their Doctor Doom. After unmasking himself, they learn his true identity, shortly before he manages to temporarily negate the FF's powers and escape, concluding that he has no reason to trust that they will not turn on him like the FF of his world did. Capturing a recently discovered mutant, the alternative Iron Man attempts to return to his home dimension by using the mutant as a power source, but is attacked by Spider-Man and X-23 as they investigate the situation. After the appearance of Captain America and Black Widow, he realizes that he is in an alternative world, but continues to fight the heroes, calling them all 'Richards' lackeys', proclaiming that he cannot trust that they will not turn into 'villains' just as his own former allies did. He is defeated thanks to Spider-Man and X-23's use of their own version of the fastball special to destroy his equipment, shortly after 'warning' the other heroes of the Titannus War (by saying that he would not kill them now because it would be a kindness).

While the alternative Tony Stark is kept locked up and drugged in the S.H.I.E.L.D. helicarrier, he is briefly visited by his counterpart in this universe, although he is unaware of the visit. Shortly after the alternative Stark is transferred to a conventional cell, Titannus soon arrives and fights the heroes, this time confronting a new group of Defenders assembled by Doctor Strange. When Titannus' comatose lover is revived, she tells him that she never loved him and that he was insane, causing Titannus to kill himself. The alternative Iron Man later discovers from Spider-Man and Wolverine that the Avengers were never massacred in space in this reality because the group had been disassembled; as a result, other heroes only encountered Titannus after he had attacked Tokyo in a rage, leaving the heroes who did encounter him less inclined to believe his story and averting the so-called 'Titannus War'.

Stark subsequently broke free from captivity, having immunized himself to the gas that was used to keep him sedated on board the S.H.I.E.L.D. Helicarrier. In the process, he gained the unwilling alliance of the LMD Diamondback. Having convinced her that he is the "real" Tony, the AU Tony Stark erased her memories, reshaping the former LMD into an advanced suit of armor. This armor, even more advanced than the pre-Extremis suit Iron Man wore at that time, was able to replicate any weapon from the wearer's memory. He subsequently battled Spider-Man, Wolverine, Captain America and Luke Cage, but was only defeated after the sacrifice of rookie hero Freedom Ring, who kept Iron Maniac occupied long enough for Captain America to knock him out with a shield thrown at the back of his neck.

The name Iron Maniac is what he calls himself, due to being the "sole survivor of a sane world living in a backwards, insane world".

Iron Maniac is known to be at least partially cyberized, with armor plating implanted in his chest (revealed during his escape from the Helicarrier, when he is shot). It is unknown whether the rest of his body is similarly armored or if he possesses other cybernetic enhancements.

He has been briefly mentioned as being held in a S.H.I.E.L.D. Helicarrier recently in The Irredeemable Ant-Man.

Iron Man Noir
In Iron Man Noir, Tony Stark is an industrialist in the 1930s. He is also an adventurer, whose exploits are recorded in Marvels: A Magazine Of Men's Adventure. He is initially accompanied by his associate James Rhodes, his personal assistant Giulietta Nefaria and his biographer Vergil Munsey. When Nefaria is revealed as working with the Nazis (specifically Baron Zemo and Baron von Strucker) and Vergil is killed, their role in the story is taken by Stark's new biographer Pepper Potts. His heart having been damaged on an earlier adventure, Stark keeps it going with repulsor technology installed and recharged by Stark Industries engineer Edwin Jarvis.

While investigating a mysterious power source in the ruins of Atlantis, Pepper Potts gets kidnapped by the Nazis and taken to their stronghold in Norway. To rescue her, Stark and Rhodes don suits of bulky power armor built by Jarvis, but are shocked to discover that 'Baron Zemo' is actually Tony's missing father Howard Stark, brainwashed by a unique chemical compound to serve the Nazis. Despite his depleted power supply, Tony manages to destroy the various suits of armor that Zemo had built for the Nazis, concluding that his father had died long ago, before returning to the USA.

Mangaverse
In the Marvel Mangaverse reality, Tony Stark creates the original armor together with Dr. Ho Yinsen and acts as Iron Man for a time, but eventually vanishes after a battle with Namor, the Submariner. He is succeeded by Antoinette (Toni) Stark, his twin sister, a former agent of SHIELD, who turns Iron Man into a massive operation - a veritable army of Iron Men in many forms, with herself as Iron Woman. After she dies in battle against the Hulk, Tony Stark reveals himself again; he has gone underground after spinal cancer reduced him to a disembodied head hooked up to a life support system. However, he has designed a new armor, and a body that he can integrate with.

He also had designed four massive vehicles for the Avengers of his world to use, which could combine (in a manner resembling old-fashioned combining super robots like Combattler V and Voltes V) into a skyscraper-sized Iron Man-mecha (dubbed Ultimate Iron Man in its first appearance, then the Iron Avenger in its battle with the Hulk, and finally "the Avenger's mecha" in Volume 2 of the series). Unfortunately it was quickly destroyed by that world's Hulk. Apparently, however, it was rebuilt again by the time of the second volume, this time as a single robotic unit without transformation (or, if it was capable of transformation, it was never demonstrated). This unit helped fight off the giant Galactus spores, but was later destroyed, along with most of the Avengers, single-handedly by the Mangaverse version of Dr. Doom.

Marvel Adventures
The Marvel Adventures Iron Man is very similar to the Earth-616 Iron Man, but with some changes. Instead of suffering damage to his heart due to a booby trap in Vietnam, Tony Stark's heart was damaged when an experimental plane he was flying was brought down by A.I.M. A.I.M. wanted Stark to build weapons and devices for them. Dr. Gia-Bao Yinsen aided Tony in escaping AIM, but Yinsen died saving his country from A.I.M. Iron Man does not seem to have problems with alcoholism, since the Marvel Adventures is aimed at a younger demographic. Iron Man's armor resembles his Extremis armor although Iron Man has other armors that fit over his regular armor, as in the case of his underwater armor.

Marvel Apes
The version of Iron Man appearing in the Marvel Apes mini-series is a mandrill, appropriately being named the Iron Mandrill.  He is a member of the Apevengers. At one point, he is attacked by the zombified Wasp of the Marvel Zombies universe and infected, though he is later apparently cured when these events are undone via time travel.

Marvel Zombies
There are different versions of Iron Man in the Marvel Zombies series:

The first series
In the Marvel Zombies universe, Tony Stark has been infected by the zombie virus.  Alongside a horde of starving undead superhuman zombies, Iron Man attacks the Silver Surfer. The attack is successful, but one of the Surfer's energy bolts hits Iron Man's lower torso, cutting him in half. The zombie "survives" this wound and later gains cosmic powers (including flight) by eating part of the Surfer's corpse. When Galactus arrives, Iron Man and the five other surviving zombies devour him.  They are able to absorb Galactus' power, and call themselves "The Galacti".

Marvel Zombies 2
He also appears in Marvel Zombies 2, one of the small group of super-powered zombies that have eaten their way across all known space. Here Stark has had his entire lost lower body replaced with cybernetics. He also appears to have forgotten he had some design in the machine which opened a link to the Ultimate Universe.  He was shocked to see Forge, one of the surviving X-Men, wearing his Mark I armored suit. The zombified Hulk kills Iron Man when he stomps through the armor, forcing Tony Stark's flesh and blood through any openings left in the armor. However Iron Man had recently revived next issue, but only as a cameo, on Marvel Zombies 3.

Marvel Zombies Return
In the final issue of Marvel Zombies 2, the remaining zombies are transported to another universe. At the point where the zombies reach this new reality, the period is nearly identical to the one where Tony Stark was an alcoholic. Zombie Giant Man infects Happy Hogan, Pepper Potts and a number of other people at Stark Industries. A drunken Tony Stark lacks the will power to become Iron Man despite Pepper Potts' requests, so James Rhodes dons the suit to save him. Crucial to fate of the multiverse are the nanites that Stark has accidentally created, which destroy damaged flesh and tissue as a cure for cancer, and prove to be a potent weapon against the zombies. This was grafted onto Flint Marko's body. He sacrifices himself to kill several zombies in Stark Tower, with Rhodes permanently succeeding him in the role of Iron Man. His nanites are then used by his successor, now a member of the New Avengers, years later to kill the remaining super-powered zombies and end the inter-dimensional zombie threat.

MC2
In the alternative future of MC2, Tony Stark retires after the loss of many heroes in battle, but eventually creates the armored computer program Mainframe, which joins the next generation of Avengers.

Mini Marvels

Iron Man is a recurring character in "Mini Marvels". He appears in story arcs like "The Armored Avengers" & "World War Hulk". He is portrayed as conceited and thinks himself the best of the team. He has a friendly rivalry with Hawkeye.

Mutant X
In Mutant X, Tony Stark is Iron Giant Man and part of the anti-mutant group the Avengers. He was later killed by X-Man Captain America along with the other Avengers.

Newuniversal
In the alternative world of newuniversal, Tony Stark is one of three humans altered by the Fireworks on April 26, 1953, gaining abilities associated with the Cipher glyph. Prior to the Fireworks, Stark is unexceptional, but he then becomes a technological genius. His discoveries revitalise his father's company, Stark Industries, and are "five years ahead of everything everyone else is working on". There are suggestions that he is capable of more, but is not making all of his discoveries public.

Stark's transformation is noticed by the National Security Agency's Project Spitfire, which is discreetly monitoring the superhumans created by the Fireworks. In March 1959, Stark's plane crashes in North Vietnam and he is imprisoned. He escapes by constructing an Iron Man suit from "spare parts" and flying out of the country.

On April 4, 1959, when he returns to the US, the NSA takes Stark to a San Diego naval base, ostensibly to debrief him. Stark is then shot dead by Philip L. Voight, a Project Spitfire agent, to prevent him from making contact with the other superhumans.

The Iron Man suit is seized by Project Spitfire and reverse engineered by Doctor Joe Swann, eventually becoming the basis of the project's H.E.X suit, an exoskeleton designed for combat with superhumans.

Realm of Kings
In this one-shot, Quasar, the newly resurrected Protector of the Universe travels into the Fault, the immense tear which has appeared in the fabric of spacetime itself after the catastrophic battle between Vulcan and Black Bolt. Reaching what he perceives to be the other end of the tunnel that is the Fault, he arrives in another universe... a dark, twisted universe, the `corpse of a universe´, possessed by Lovecraftian horrors which are worshipped by all the denizens of that universe, including Earth's mightiest heroes. Iron Man is never seen outside his armor, but he, like the others, serves the "Many-angled ones" with total devotion.

Ruins
In the two issue Warren Ellis series Ruins, Tony Stark is a rich industrialist who supplied weapons for the US military in an attempt to win the Vietnam War. This version of Iron Man was injured while mediating between US forces and pro-secessionist Californians by a piece of shrapnel thrown by the National Guard. This embittered Stark who formed a revolutionary cell named the Avengers. This version of Iron Man was betrayed by Scarlet Witch who provided the United States military information to crush the Avengers. Tony Stark is presumably killed.

Secret Wars (2015)
During the "Secret Wars" storyline, there are different versions of Iron Man that exist in the different Battleworld domains:

 In the Battleworld domain of Technopolis, Tony Stark is the Baron of Technopolis where everybody wears high-tech armor to protect themselves from an airborne virus. Tony is shown to be in competition with his brother Arno. It turns out that Howard Stark created the airborne virus that caused everybody to wear high-tech armors. Both brothers were defeated by Lila Rhodes and were arrested by the Thor Corps.
 In the Battleworld domain of Spider-Island, Iron Man is mutated into one of the Spider Queen's spider minions and battles Agent Venom and the now monstrous Avengers. Venom sprays Tony with Norman Osborn's Green Goblin formula, freeing Tony from the Queen, but slowly making him insane. He modifies Norman's armor and becomes the Iron Goblin to aid the resistance. When they are surrounded by a number of Man-Spiders (including Giant Man) with few means of escape, Tony sacrifices himself using the Black Knight's Ebony Blade so he can aid them and die before the Goblin formula completely takes him over.
 The Secret Wars War Zone tie-in 1872 reimagines Tony in the Wild West and living in the Battleworld domain called the Valley of Doom. Tony was once a respected inventor who lives in the town of Timely. When the Union army used his repeating rifle to slaughter a large group of Confederates rather let them surrender, Tony spirals into alcoholism. After Sheriff Steve Rogers is murdered by Mayor Wilson Fisk and his cohorts, Tony builds a large suit of armor resembling the original Iron Man suit to aid Red Wolf in bringing him down. After Fisk is defeated, Tony dedicates his time to aiding the people of Timely with his new invention.
 The Iron Man of the Battleworld domain of 2099 is a man named Sonny Frisco. Despite piloting a normal-sized suit of Iron Man armor, Frisco actually suffers from dwarfism. He is a member of the Alchemax corporation's team of Avengers, and secretly uses the help of Vision, a woman with precognitive abilities.

Spider-Verse
In the Amazing Spider-Man comic's event Spider-Verse, Spider-Woman (Jessica Drew), Scarlet Spider (Kaine) and Spider-man (Ben Reily) meet and fight a clone of Tony Stark (Earth-802) as Iron Man serving one of the Inheritors, Jennix.

Spider-Gwen
In Spider-Gwen Tony Stark of Earth-65 is an arms dealer, the owner of global private military company WAR MACHINE, and owner of the coffee chain StarkBucks.

Spider-Man: Life Story
In Spider-Man: Life Story, Tony Stark/Iron Man does not face a traumatizing experience that leads to stop weapons manufacturing as his Earth-616 counterpart did instead he continues to produce them and play a key role in the Vietnam War and a World War III-esque conflict known as "The Russian War" as well as participating in Secret Wars while on Battleworld. Iron Man also became Secretary of Defense in the United States government and was one of the two leaders alongside Captain America in the Superhuman Civil War.

Squadron Supreme
In the Squadron Supreme series, the equivalent of Iron Man is Tucker Ford. Tucker was a very intelligent boy since his early years, however since being raised by his strong-willed mother along with never going to school with anyone his own age made Tucker to have difficulty to make any kind of meaningful personal relationship and because of this, he became very introverted. As he grew up, he had built an imaginative world where he was a superhero. When trying to explain his imaginations to his therapist, they turned around and mocked him before their colleagues, however being unaware that Tucker had them under electronic surveillance. This experience motivated him to follow his dream and become a real superhero.
As a young adult, he built a powerful, but unstable armor made from nanotechnology in order to achieve his dream, eventually meeting the head of S.H.I.E.L.D., Nick Fury and offered his intelligence and company to Nick Fury to help defend America.
He fails to gain the affection of Nick Fury and to get a kiss from the spider-powered superhuman, Nell Ruggles, also known as Arachnophilia. He offers to build a S.H.I.E.L.D. Hellicarrier as a base for the organization and to be a member of the team in order to live out of his imagination. The only person that Tucker had the closest relationship with is Nell, expressing romantic feelings towards her.

Ultimate Marvel

What If

Newer Fantastic Four
In the timeline of What if: Newer Fantastic Four, the Fantastic Four were killed by De'Lila (a rogue Skrull) and the Hulk, so Spider-Man, the Ghost Rider and Wolverine joined to avenge them as the New Fantastic Four. Thanos of Titan, as in the mainline universe, came into possession of the six Infinity Gems and became ruler of all reality, before erasing half of all living beings from existence. Among those who vanished was Ghost Rider, and, being present at the battle during which he was erased, Iron Man takes his place.  The Newer Fantastic Four soon realize they are outmatched.  Stark, with help from the Hulk, manages to salvage the empty armor of Ziran, a Celestial, and realizes it can be controlled by thoughts. Stark takes control of the armor and connects it to the Negative Zone, allowing him to call on all the power of that reality. Despite this, he is defeated by Thanos.  Stark's sacrifice allows Wolverine to trick Thanos into a position where the Gauntlet could be removed. Spider-Man subsequently uses the Gauntlet to undo the damage Thanos had caused.

Iron Man: Demon in an Armor
In What If: Iron Man: Demon in an Armor, Tony Stark is Doom's college roommate rather than Reed Richards, inspiring Doom to develop a machine that allows him to transfer his mind into Stark's body while leaving Stark trapped in Doom's body with no memory of his past. While Doom uses Stark's connections and company to establish himself, the amnesic Stark- believing himself to be Doom- works to rebuild his life, creating his own company and forming his own reputation from the ground up. This culminates in a confrontation between the two wearing early versions of their respective armors- Doom having developed a green-and-silver Iron Man armor while Stark has created Doom's costume with gold and a red cloak-, during which Doom reveals the truth about their switch, only for Stark to reject the offer to switch back because Doom has destroyed the name of Tony Stark while Doctor von Doom has developed an honorable reputation.

X-Men Forever
In this alternative universe of X-Men Forever, Tony Stark, while still publicly the super-hero Iron Man, is also the head of the shadowy organization known as The Consortium. The scientific wing of the organization is headed by the Trask family, who turn out to be his relatives. They create newer versions of the Sentinels and kidnap mutants to use in experimentation to find the cause of the so-called "Burnout" syndrome that causes mutants to die early. However, as part of his efforts to undermine the Consortium's anti-mutant agenda, he becomes Nick Fury's insider and eventually sacrifices his life along with Beast. He assists Storm- who has been split into an amnesic child version of herself and an energy form with full memory and no body- by providing her energy self with a suit based on the now-deceased Black Panther so that her energy can maintain corporeal form, although he is subsequently killed by a twisted clone of Storm before he can reveal her existence to anyone else.

In other media

In 1966, Iron Man was featured in a series of cartoons. In 1981, Iron Man guest appeared in Spider-Man and His Amazing Friends, but only as Tony Stark. He went on to feature again in his own series in the 1990s as part of the Marvel Action Hour with the Fantastic Four; Robert Hays provided his voice in these animated cartoons. Iron Man makes an appearance in the episode "Shell Games" of Fantastic Four: World's Greatest Heroes. Apart from comic books, Iron Man appears in Capcom's "Vs." video games, including Marvel Super Heroes,  Marvel vs. Capcom 2: New Age of Heroes, Marvel vs. Capcom 3: Fate of Two Worlds, and Ultimate Marvel vs. Capcom 3. Iron Man is a playable character in the 1992 arcade game Captain America and the Avengers, Marvel: Ultimate Alliance and its sequel, and Marvel Nemesis: Rise of the Imperfects, as well as being featured as an unlockable character in X-Men Legends II: Rise of Apocalypse and Tony Hawk's Underground. Iron man was also featured in an independent video game based upon the first movie called Iron Man that was playable on the Nintendo DS, PlayStation 2, PlayStation 3, PlayStation Portable (PSP), Wii, Xbox 360, and Microsoft Windows. He is also seen in Iron Man VR made for the PlayStation 4, and is featured in the 2020 Marvel's Avengers (video game) that is payable on the PlayStation 4, PlayStation 5, Stadia, Microsoft Windows, Xbox One, and the Xbox Series X and Series S. Set for the end of 2023, there will also be a new single-player Iron Man game released. In the 2009 animated series, Iron Man: Armored Adventures, most of the characters, including Tony Stark, are teenagers. An anime adaptation aired in Japan in late 2010 as part of a collaboration between Marvel Animation and Madhouse, in which Stark, voiced by Keiji Fujiwara, travels to Japan where he ends up facing off against the Zodiac, a terrorist organization that is aligned with A.I.M in order to produce several mechanic suits embodying astrological star signs.

In 2008, a film adaptation titled Iron Man was released, starring Robert Downey Jr. as Tony Stark and directed by Jon Favreau. Iron Man was met with positive reviews from film critics, grossing $318 million domestically and $585 million worldwide, and became the first in a series of over 20 films, later becoming known as the Marvel Cinematic Universe. The character of Tony Stark, again played by Robert Downey Jr., appeared at the end of the 2008 film The Incredible Hulk. Downey reprised his role in Iron Man 2 (2010), Marvel's The Avengers (2012), Iron Man 3 (2013), Avengers: Age of Ultron (2015), Captain America: Civil War (2016), Spider-Man: Homecoming (2017), Avengers: Infinity War (2018), and Avengers: Endgame (2019).

In 2009, Playtech released an online casino slot machine game called Iron Man. After that they created two more games, Iron Man 2 and Iron Man 3.

In October 2016, Eoin Colfer released a young adult novel called Iron Man: The Gauntlet.

See also
List of Iron Man enemies
Jetpack man

References

Further reading
 Will Cooley and Mark C. Rogers, "Ike's Nightmare:  Iron Man and the Military-Industrial Complex," in Ages of Iron Man, Joseph Dorowski, ed., 2015. 
 Tom DeFalco, Avengers: The Ultimate Guide, Dorling Kindersley, 2005. 
 Mark D. White (ed.), Iron Man and Philosophy: Facing the Stark Reality, Wiley-Blackwell, 2010.

External links

 
 
 "Stark Reality: A Different Hero for Different Times" by Ian Chant - PopMatters.com
 Advanced Iron (fanzine)
 Iron Man Library 
 

 
Avengers (comics) characters
Characters created by Don Heck
Characters created by Jack Kirby
Characters created by Larry Lieber
Characters created by Stan Lee
Cold War in popular culture
Comics characters introduced in 1963
Cyborg superheroes
Fictional alcohol abusers
Fictional aerospace engineers
Fictional arms dealers
Fictional business executives
Fictional characters from New York City
Fictional electronic engineers
Fictional inventors
Fictional military strategists
Fictional nuclear engineers
Fictional roboticists
Fictional socialites
Fictional technopaths
Iron Man characters
Marvel Comics adapted into films
Marvel Comics adapted into video games
Marvel Comics American superheroes
Marvel Comics cyborgs
Marvel Comics film characters
Marvel Comics male superheroes
Marvel Comics scientists
S.H.I.E.L.D. agents
Superheroes who are adopted
Telepresence in fiction
Fictional hackers
Fictional mechanics